Linda Hamilton is an American actress. She is best known for her portrayal of Sarah Connor in the Terminator film series and Catherine Chandler in the television series Beauty and the Beast (1987-1990), for which she was nominated for two Golden Globe Awards and an Emmy Award. She also starred as Vicky Baxter in the horror film Children of the Corn (1984), Doctor Amy Franklin in the monster film King Kong Lives (1986), and Mayor Rachel Wando in the disaster thriller film Dante's Peak (1997). Hamilton had a recurring role as Mary Elizabeth Bartowski on NBC's Chuck.

Film

Television

Video games

References

External links
Linda Hamilton on IMDb
Linda Hamilton at the Rotten Tomatoes

American filmographies
Actress filmographies